Henry Dermot Ponsonby Moore, 12th Earl of Drogheda (born 1937), is a British photographer known professionally as Derry Moore. He inherited the title of Earl of Drogheda from his father, The 11th Earl of Drogheda. He had the right to use the courtesy title Viscount Moore from November 1957 until December 1989.

Education and career 
Henry Dermot Ponsonby Moore was born on 14 January 1937 in London into an Anglo-Irish aristocratic family, the son of Charles Garrett Ponsonby Moore (11th Earl of Drogheda), and Joan Eleanor ( Carr). He was educated at Eton then studied painting at Oskar Kokoschka's School of Seeing in Salzburg, Austria. After working briefly as a travel agent in New York City, he took photography lessons from British photographer Bill Brandt. Then-Viscount Moore (as he was up until inheriting the earldom in December 1989) began his professional career in 1973, with a commission from the American magazine Architectural Digest.  He photographed The Princess of Wales, Prince William and Prince Harry in 1992. His portrait, taken at Kensington Palace, was used by the Princess on her Christmas cards for that year.

Lord Drogheda photographed Queen Elizabeth II, the late Queen Elizabeth The Queen Mother, Indira Gandhi, Ronald Reagan, David Bowie, Iman, Benedict Cumberbatch and Helena Bonham Carter, as well as many other personalities. He became a leading photographer of architectural interiors and an illustrator of books, and had portraits published in Country Life and Vogue. He has thirty-seven portraits in the National Portrait Gallery's collection.

Books 
 The Dream Come True: Great Houses of Los Angeles; text by Brendan Gill (Lippincott & Crowell, 1980)
 Royal Gardens; by George Plumptre (Collins, 1981)
 Debrett's The Stately Homes of Britain: Introduced by the Owners; by Sybilla Jane Flower (Webb & Bower, 1982)
 Washington: Houses of the Capital; text by Henry Mitchell (Viking Press, 1982)
 The Englishwoman's House; edited by Alvilde Lees-Milne (Collins, 1984)
 The English Room; with Michael Pick (Weidenfeld & Nicolson, 1985)
 The Englishman's Room; edited by Alvilde Lees-Milne (Viking, 1986)
 The Gardens of Queen Elizabeth the Queen Mother. A Personal Tour with The Marchioness of Salisbury (Viking, 1988)
 The Shell Guide to the Gardens of England and Wales; with Sarah Hollis (Andre Deutsch, 1989)
 Evening Ragas: A Photographer in India (John Murray, 1997)
 Inside the House of Lords; with Clive Aslet (HarperCollins, 1998)
 Rooms; edited by Joseph Holtzman (Rizzoli, 2006)
 Notting Hill (Frances Lincoln, 2007)
 A Gardener's Life; by The Dowager Marchioness of Salisbury (Frances Lincoln, 2007)
 Sir John Soane's Museum, London; text by Tim Knox (Merrell, 2009) 3rd edition, 2016 
 In House; text by Mitchell Owens (Rizzoli, 2009)
 Great Gardens of Italy; with Monty Don (Quadrille, 2011)
 An English Room (Prestel, 2013)
 Houghton Hall: Portrait of an English Country House; by David Cholmondeley & Andrew Moore (Skira, 2014)
 Horses: Portraits by Derry Moore (Rizzoli, 2016)
 In the Shadow of the Raj: Derry Moore in India (Prestel, 2017)
 Great English Interiors; with David Mlinaric (Prestel, 2018)
 Paradise Gardens: The World's Most Beautiful Islamic Gardens; with Monty Don (Two Roads, 2018)
 Japanese Gardens: A Journey; with Monty Don (Two Roads, 2019)
 London's Great Theatres; text by Simon Callow (Prestel, 2019)
 American Gardens; with Monty Don (Prestel, 2020)
 Venetian Gardens; with Monty Don (BBC, 2022)

Personal life
Lord Drogheda has been married to:
Eliza Winn Lloyd (died 7 May 2008). She was the only daughter of Stacy Barcroft Lloyd Jr. and his first wife, the former Rachel Lambert; a stepdaughter of American banker and art collector Paul Mellon; and a great-granddaughter of Jordan Wheat Lambert, co-inventor of Listerine mouthwash. They married on 15 May 1968 and divorced in 1972. Caroline Kennedy was a flower girl at the couple's wedding, and John F. Kennedy, Jr. was a page. The then Viscount and Viscountess Moore had no children, and she did not remarry.
Alexandra Nicolette Henderson, the daughter of British diplomat Sir Nicholas Henderson and his wife, the former Mary Barber (née Cawadias). They married in Paris in 1978 and have three children: Benjamin Garrett Henderson Moore, Viscount Moore (born 1983), The Hon. Garrett Alexander Moore (born 1986), and Lady Marina Alice Moore (born 1988). As Alexandra Henderson, Lady Drogheda has been a producer and editor in the news and current affairs departments of the BBC, BBC1 and Talent TV.

Coat of arms

References

External links

1937 births
Living people
People educated at Eton College
20th-century British photographers
20th-century Anglo-Irish people
Earls of Drogheda
Date of birth missing (living people)
People from London
Drogheda
21st-century Anglo-Irish people